This is a list of recipients of the Dr Lee Jong-wook Memorial Prize for Public Health awarded by the World Health Organization.

Established in 2008 in memory of Lee Jong-wook (1945–2006) to celebrate outstanding contributions to public health that went beyond the call of normal duties. The prize consists of a plaque and a sum of money which will not exceed $100,000 USD.

List of recipients

See also 

 List of Ihsan Doğramacı Family Health Foundation Prize laureates
 List of Léon Bernard Foundation Prize laureates
 List of Sasakawa Health Prize laureates
 List of United Arab Emirates Health Foundation Prize laureates
 List of Sheikh Sabah Al-Ahmad Al-Jaber Al-Sabah Prize laureates
 List of Dr A.T. Shousha Foundation Prize and Fellowship laureates
 List of The State of Kuwait Prize for the Control of Cancer, Cardiovascular Diseases and Diabetes in the Eastern Mediterranean Region laureates
 List of Jacques Parisot Foundation Fellowship laureates
 List of The Darling Foundation Prize laureates

References 

World Health Organization
Public health
Dr LEE Jong-wook Memorial Prize for Public Health laureates